The Singanhoe  or New Trunk Association was a Korean nationalist organization under Japanese colonial rule, founded on February 15, 1927, that unified Korean socialist and nationalist factions and maintained a unilateral independence movement until May 1931. Including both Korean and overseas branches, this organization was able to attract a total membership of between 30,000 – 40,000 people. While internal strife between leftist and rightist factions was a consistent obstacle, the Singanhoe actively pursued several goals: 
the abolishment of racial, political, and economic oppression
the attainment of freedoms of speech, organization, association, and publishing
the support of youth and women's equality movements
the overturning of factionalism and clan nepotism
the opposition to the East Asia Colonial Development Company
the propagation of the economic frugality movement.

Background

After the March 1st Movement, as the political awareness of the masses was greatly raised, the Korean nationalist movement of the 1920s developed rapidly and spread throughout Korea and beyond. This nationalistic consciousness was manifest in Manchuria through the armed struggle for independence, in areas under Chinese jurisdiction through the diplomatic efforts of the Provisional Government of the Republic of Korea, and within Korea through the efforts of the labor, farmer, and youth movements. In response, Imperial Japan used the deceptively labeled Cultural Rule developmental policy in an attempt to weaken and fragment the strength of this nationalist movement. 

In particular, during this period, Imperial Japan shifted attention from the widely propagated Practical Skills Development Movement to the Autonomy Movement. Yi Kwangsu’s “The Administration of a Nation” outlined the general precepts of the Autonomy Movement (known in English scholarship as the Cultural Nationalist movement), which stressed the development of Korean infrastructure from within Japanese colonial rule, rather than pushing for immediate independence. Immediately after the Cultural Nationalist Movement was proposed, writers from the Choson ilbo, including Yi Sangchae, An Chaehong, and Chǒndoist scholar Kwǒn Tongjin championed an uncompromising united nationalist front while harshly criticizing the Cultural Nationalist Movement. On the other hand, others like Hǒ Hǒn and Hong Myǒnghui from the newly popularized socialist camps searched for a means of cooperation.

Solidarity within the Socialist Movement
From the mid-1920s, there was a rising sentiment within the socialist camp regarding the need for a comprehensive umbrella organization. Even within the nascent socialist camp, which spread rapidly after the events of the March 1st Movement, activists began to recognize the necessity of a cooperative front with the nationalist camp. They drew much inspiration from the successful cooperation in China of the Communists and the Nationalists in forming a united movement against imperialism and towards national independence.

Formation
Even as the nationalist camp and socialist camps sought mutual cooperation, the socialists looked beyond the strict class ideology that marked the earlier movement, and from 1924 could be categorized into two camps: the cooperative nationalist camp and the revolutionary nationalist camp. As a result, from 1926, there started to be an organizational start to this search for an uncompromising movement.

Although they were not successful in actualizing these plans, Kang Talyǒng, who was the second secretariat of the Korean Communist Party, made contact with Kwǒn Tongjin, An Chaehong, and Kim Chunyǒn, among others. The Korean National Party's desire to create an organized national front in response to the general trend towards the Autonomy Movement is a representative example of the situation at the time. 

The cooperation between recalcitrant nationalists and socialists progressed rapidly as the Chǒng’uhoe (正友會) published the Chǒng’uhoe Statement which advocated the establishment of a singular nationalist body that was a coalition between nationalist and socialist camps.

The Chǒng’uhoe Declaration
  

Chǒng’uhoe was a socialist ideological body made up of the Tuesday Club, the Pukpunghoe, the Chosǒn Communist Party, and the Proletariat Alliance. By 1926, socialism had grown to such a large scale extent that 338 ideological circles were active, but the aforementioned four groups constitute the principle influences of Korea's socialist movement.

The Chǒng’uhoe, which had been formed in April 1926, made their famous proclamation on November of the same year. The main crux of the proclamation, which criticized the previous activities of the socialist movement, were the advocacy of “the elimination of the factionalism and the unification of ideology,” “a shift from the economic struggle to political struggle,” and “the development of a unified nationalistic body.” In other words, “so that the influence of nationalism would not degrade, we must progressively support other groups and fight” became their mantra. Thus in line with their proclamation, once the Singanhoe was formed as a united nationalist body, the Chǒnguhoe bravely dissolved their organization.

Among the various organs established to promote understanding between the dual branches of socialism and nationalism, the Singanhoe was the first to advocate a thoroughly consolidated organization. In order to receive the imprimatur of the office of the Japanese Governor-General of Korea, the vice president of Chosǒn ilbo took action, and while he originally proposed the title of “Sinhanhoe” (新韓會) for the organization, the Governor-General did not approve so the name was revised to “Singanhoe” (新幹會).

Establishment Principles
We advocate the promotion of a greater political and economic awareness
We advocate firm, mutual cooperation
We decisively oppose opportunism

See also
Heo Jong-suk
 Geunwoohoe
Korean independence movement